Vani Vihar railway station is a small railway station in Saheed Nagar Bhubaneswar, Odisha. Its code is BNBH. The station consists of two platforms. The platforms are not well sheltered. It has a few facilities such as a non-computerised ticket counter, water supply, and urinals.

The main railway station of the city, Bhubaneswar railway station, is always preferred over Vani Vihar station for catching long-distance trains as only a few passenger trains halt here. Local people frequently use this station to cross from Saheed Nagar to Rasulgarh.

The station is named after the Vani Vihar area where the Vani Vihar University is located.

References

External links 

Khurda Road railway division
Buildings and structures in Bhubaneswar
Railway stations in Bhubaneswar